Carex pedunculata, the long-stalk sedge or longstalk sedge, is a species of flowering plant in the genus Carex, native to Canada and the central and eastern United States. Its seeds are dispersed by ants.

References

pedunculata
Plants described in 1805